Plocamopherus is a genus of sea slugs, specifically nudibranchs, shell-less marine gastropod molluscs in the family Polyceridae, subfamily Triophinae. A unique character of Plocamopherus species is a globular bioluminescent organ at the tip of the pair of appendages which are placed just behind the gills. Many species are known to be nocturnal and several are from deep water. They feed on bryozoans.

It contains bioluminescent species.

Species 
Species in the genus Plocamopherus include:
 Plocamopherus amboinensis Bergh, 1890 
 Plocamopherus apheles Barnard, 1927 
 Plocamopherus ceylonicus (Kelaart, 1858) 
 Plocamopherus fulgurans Risbec, 1928
 Plocamopherus imperialis Angas, 1864 
 Plocamopherus indicus Bergh, 1890 
 Plocamopherus lemur Vallès & Gosliner, 2006 
 Plocamopherus lucayensis Hamann & Farmer, 1988 
 Plocamopherus maculapodium Vallès & Gosliner, 2006 
 Plocamopherus maculatus (Pease, 1860) 
 Plocamopherus maderae (Lowe, 1842) 
 Plocamopherus margaretae Vallès & Gosliner, 2006 
 Plocamopherus ocellatus Rueppell & Leuckart, 1828 
 Plocamopherus pecoso Vallès & Gosliner, 2006 
 Plocamopherus pilatectus Hamann & Farmer, 1988 
 Plocamopherus tilesii'' Bergh, 1877

References

Polyceridae
Bioluminescent molluscs